Hannah Smith (born 1986) is a Scottish and former Welsh international lawn and indoor bowler.

Bowls career
Smith from Carmarthen won the fours gold medal at the 2009 Atlantic Bowls Championships.

She then won a bronze medal in the pairs at the 2010 Commonwealth Games in Delhi and two years later won another bronze in the triples at the 2012 World Outdoor Bowls Championship in Adelaide.

Smith later represented Scotland and in 2019 she won the Scottish National Bowls Championships pairs title with Claire Johnston. Smith and Johnston then went on to win the 2022 pairs title at the British Isles Bowls Championships in Llandrindod Wells.

Smith will represent Scotland at the 2022 Commonwealth Games. In 2022, she duly competed in the women's pairs and the Women's fours at the Games.

References 

1986 births
Welsh female bowls players
Scottish female bowls players
Living people
Commonwealth Games medallists in lawn bowls
Commonwealth Games bronze medallists for Wales
Bowls players at the 2010 Commonwealth Games
Bowls players at the 2022 Commonwealth Games
Medallists at the 2010 Commonwealth Games